This was a new event in 2013.

Nigina Abduraimova and Maria Elena Camerin won the tournament, defeating Tadeja Majerič and Andreea Mitu in the final, 6–3, 2–6, [10–8].

Seeds

Draw

References 
 Draw

Kemer Cup - Doubles